Quarrendon is a deserted medieval village in Buckinghamshire, England.

Quarrendon may also refer to:

 Quarrendon Estate, a housing estate in Aylesbury, Buckinghamshire, England
 Quarrendon School, now Aylesbury Vale Academy, Buckinghamshire, England

See also
 Quarrington (disambiguation)